Beasley is a city in Fort Bend County, Texas, United States, within the Houston–Sugar Land metropolitan area. The city's population was 641 at the 2010 census, up from 590 at the 2000 census. State Highway Loop 540 goes straight through the city from the northeast to the southwest while U.S. Route 59, the Southwest Freeway, passes to the south of Beasley. The Union Pacific Railroad tracks run parallel with Loop 540.

Geography

Beasley is located in west-central Fort Bend County at  (29.496435, –95.917297).

Demographics

As of the census of 2000, there were 590 people, 216 households, and 155 families residing in the city. The population density was 587.9 people per square mile (227.8/km2). There were 232 housing units at an average density of 231.2 per square mile (89.6/km2). The racial makeup of the city was 77.97% White, 6.61% African American, 12.71% from other races, and 2.71% from two or more races. Hispanic or Latino of any race were 30.68% of the population.

There were 216 households, out of which 35.6% had children under the age of 18 living with them, 56.9% were married couples living together, 10.6% had a female householder with no husband present, and 28.2% were non-families. 24.1% of all households were made up of individuals, and 7.9% had someone living alone who was 65 years of age or older. The average household size was 2.73 and the average family size was 3.28.

In the city, the population was spread out, with 28.3% under the age of 18, 8.6% from 18 to 24, 28.3% from 25 to 44, 23.4% from 45 to 64, and 11.4% who were 65 years of age or older. The median age was 36 years. For every 100 females, there were 98.0 males. For every 100 females age 18 and over, there were 91.4 males.

The median income for a household in the city was $35,000, and the median income for a family was $47,625. Males had a median income of $30,139 versus $29,107 for females. The per capita income for the city was $14,984. About 5.7% of families and 16.2% of the population were below the poverty line, including 18.9% of those under age 18 and 24.1% of those age 65 or over.

Government and infrastructure
The United States Postal Service Beasley Post Office is located at 7031 Loop 540. Kansas City Southern and CenterPoint Properties jointly own the 689-acre CenterPoint Intermodal Center-Houston Metro (CIC-HM), which opened in 2009.

Fort Bend County does not have a hospital district. OakBend Medical Center serves as the county's charity hospital which the county contracts with.

Economy

The largest employer in the Beasley area is Hudson Products Corporation, which established manufacturing operations in 1973 on approximately 260 acres located 2 miles west of Beasley.

Education
Residents are zoned to Lamar Consolidated Independent School District.

Residents are zoned to:
 Beasley Elementary School
 it has about 450 students. Beasley Elementary opened in 1902, with eight students. The parent teacher organization opened in 1918. The school became a part of LCISD in 1947. The building presently in use opened in 1985.
 Navarro Middle School
 George Junior High School
 B. F. Terry High School

The designated community college for LCISD is Wharton County Junior College.

Gallery

References

Cities in Texas
Cities in Fort Bend County, Texas
Greater Houston